The Belle Stars is the only studio album by the all-female band of the same name released in 1983 (see 1983 in music). The band's eponymous debut album reached number 15 on the UK Albums Chart. The Belle Stars had some success with their single "Iko Iko", a cover of The Dixie Cups' 1965 hit. It charted at number 35 in June 1982 on the UK Singles Chart. Seven years later the song became a hit on the Billboard Hot 100 chart after it was featured in the movie Rain Man, where it peaked at number 14.

Track listing

Personnel
The Belle Stars
Jennie McKeown – lead vocals
Sarah-Jane Owen – lead guitar, wah–wah guitar, vocals
Stella Barker – rhythm guitar, acoustic guitar, vocals
Clare Hirst – tenor saxophone, keyboards, vocals
Miranda Joyce – alto saxophone, vocals
Lesley Shone – bass, vocals
Judy Parsons – drums, percussion, vocals
Additional musicians
Martin Ditcham, Graham Broad – percussion
Technical
Peter Collins – producer on tracks 1, 2, 3, 5, 9, 11
Phil Chapman, Pete Hammond, Julian Mendelsohn, Phil Harding – engineers on tracks 1, 2, 3, 5, 9, 11
Brian Tench – producer and engineer on tracks 4, 6, 7, 8, 10, 12
Pete Wingfield – producer on track 6
Alvin Clark – engineer on track 6

References

1983 debut albums
Albums produced by Peter Collins (record producer)
New wave albums by English artists
Stiff Records albums
Warner Records albums
albums recorded at Trident Studios